Qayyum Raishyan (born 5 December 2000) is a Singaporean footballer who plays for Singapore Premier League club Lion City Sailors. Currently playing Right Back (RB) position.

He started his career early in his teenage years at Junior Soccer Academy (JSA) Singapore. He eventually went for trial and got selected for National Football Academy (NFA) Singapore. He played for Singapore U18 in 2018 and represented the country in many overseas matches during his term there.

Nominated for the Dollah Kassim Award in 2016 due to his great performance at a young age.

Career
Raishyan started his senior career with Young Lions in the Singapore Premier League, where he has made nine league appearances and scored zero goals.

References

External links 
 Versatile Qayyum

Living people
2000 births
Singaporean footballers
People from Singapore
Association football defenders
Young Lions FC players